Caerwys railway station was a station in Afonwen, Flintshire, Wales. The station was named for nearby Caerwys, opened on 6 September 1869 and closed on 30 April 1962.

References

Further reading

Disused railway stations in Flintshire
Railway stations in Great Britain opened in 1869
Railway stations in Great Britain closed in 1962
Former London and North Western Railway stations
Caerwys